Santha Oru Devatha is a 1977 Indian Malayalam-language film, directed by M. Krishnan Nair and produced by K. P. Kottarakkara. The film stars Madhu, Sukumari, Thikkurissy Sukumaran Nair and Jose Prakash. The film has musical score by M. K. Arjunan.

Cast
Madhu
Sukumari
Thikkurissy Sukumaran Nair
Jose Prakash
Sukumaran
K. R. Vijaya

Soundtrack
The music was composed by M. K. Arjunan and the lyrics were written by Sreekumaran Thampi.

References

External links
 

1977 films
1970s Malayalam-language films
Films directed by M. Krishnan Nair